Paul Wheeler (born 1934) is a British screenwriter and novelist. He was born in 1934 in Kingston, Jamaica. He obtained his BA from Exeter College, Oxford in 1959 and his MA from the University of Chicago in 1960.

As a screenwriter, he is best known for his scripts for The Medallion (2003), Caravan to Vaccares (1974) and The Terrorists (1975). He also wrote scripts for numerous TV series like Tenko, Minder and Poldark. In the early 1980s, he published a novel on the Bodyline controversy, which was adapted as an Australian TV series starring Hugo Weaving.

He married Alexandra Martinez in 1964. He is related by marriage to the American journalist Morton Kondracke.

References

British writers
1934 births
Living people
Alumni of Exeter College, Oxford
University of Chicago alumni